The Cosău is a right tributary of the river Mara in Romania. It discharges into the Mara near Ferești.

References

Rivers of Romania
Rivers of Maramureș County